Trenton Simpson (born June 14, 2001) is an American football linebacker for the Clemson Tigers.

High school career
Simpson attended Mallard Creek High School in Charlotte, North Carolina. He played both linebacker and running back in high school. He was selected to play in the 2020 Under Armour All-America Game. A five-star recruit, Simpson originally committed to Auburn University to play college football but switched to Clemson University.

College career
As a true freshman at Clemson in 2020, Simpson played in 12 games with three starts and had 28 tackles and four sacks. In 2021, he started 12 games and recorded 65 tackles along with six sacks.

References

External links

Clemson Tigers bio

2001 births
Living people
American football linebackers
Clemson Tigers football players
Players of American football from Charlotte, North Carolina